was a Japanese samurai of the Sengoku period through early Edo period, who served the Oda clan. He is Nobunaga's stable master (umamawari, 馬廻). 

He served in a number of Nobunaga's battles, including Moribe (1561) and Anegawa (1570). After Nobunaga's death, he served Toyotomi Hideyoshi. He was the brother of Kitsuno, Oda Nobunaga's concubine.

References
http://kazusanosukede.gozaru.jp/busyou/toujyoujinbutu-i.htm

http://www.kirrah.net/his_no17.html

Samurai
1607 deaths
Year of birth unknown